Dracoderidae is a family of worms belonging to the class Cyclorhagida.

Genera:
 Dracoderes Higgins & Shirayama, 1990

References

Kinorhyncha